Manavoori Pandavulu is a 1978 Indian Telugu-language film directed by Bapu and written by Mullapudi Venkata Ramana, dealing with the struggle against the feudal system in their own unique way. The film is remake of Kannada movie Paduvaaralli Pandavaru directed by Puttanna Kanagal. In 1980, he also remade it in Hindi as Hum Paanch starring Mithun Chakraborty.

Film Companion while compiling the 25 Greatest Telugu Films of the Decade, called Rangasthalam as an updated version of this movie.

Synopsis 
The film revolves around Krishna (played by Krishnam Raju) who brings together an unlikely group of 5 youngsters to help in creating awareness among their villagers to revolt against the cruel village head, Rambhoopal (Rao Gopal Rao) and his henchmen. Even though being a revolutionary theme, the movie was wonderfully made without the usual noise that accompanies the leftist movies and fashioned on the lines of the great epic Mahabharata. Amazing performances by all the actors (Krishnam Raju, Raogopal Rao, Allu Ramalingaiah etc.) and wonderful technical backup make this movie another classic from Bapu. The film also has Chiranjeevi as a very young actor (his second movie to be released) in the role of Parthu.

Manavoori Pandavulu is the story of five youngsters come together in  village to protest against the village chief because village chief is cruel he receive 2x rent from the village farmers there income totally depend on rain, when villagers told that whole past story to the five youngsters the first person who protest against the village chief  is Parthu (Chiranjeevi ) the four come together. The village chief tries to kill them but in the end he is vanquished.

By kanchalogy

Cast 
Krishnam Raju as Krishna
Rao Gopal Rao as Rambhoopal (Dora vaaru)
Murali Mohan as Ramudu
Prasad Babu as Bheemanna
Chiranjeevi as Parthu
Allu Ramalingaiah as Kannappa
Shoba as Sundari
Geetha as Sinni
Kanta Rao as Dharmaiah
Sarathi as Rambhoopal's son
Jhansi as Santhamma
Halam as Oorvasi
Bhanuchander
Jayamalini
Vijaya Bhaskar

Soundtrack

Box-office
Katakataala Rudraiah and Mana Voori Pandavulu were released within a gap of 10 days and both the films became blockbusters.

Awards
Rashtrapati Award - Krishnam Raju
Filmfare Best Film Award (Telugu) - Krishnam Raju & Jaya Krishna
Nandi Award for Best Cinematographer - Balu Mahendra

References

External links
 

 Manavoori Pandavulu Telugu Movie Songs Lyrics 

1970s Telugu-language films
1978 films
Films directed by Bapu
Films produced by Krishnam Raju
Films scored by K. V. Mahadevan
Indian drama films
Films based on the Mahabharata
Telugu remakes of Kannada films